Little Partridge River may refer to:

Canada
Little Partridge River (Thlewiaza River) in Manitoba and Nunavut
Little Partridge River (Ontario), in Cochrane District, Ontario

United States
Little Partridge River, a tributary of the Partridge River (Crow Wing River) in Minnesota

See also 
 Partridge River (disambiguation)